Caponata (Sicilian: capunata) is a Sicilian dish consisting of chopped fried aubergine (U.S. eggplant) and other vegetables, seasoned with olive oil, tomato sauce, celery, olives, and capers, in an agrodolce sauce.

Numerous local variants exist concerning the ingredients, by adding carrots, bell peppers, potatoes, pine nuts, and raisins.

There is a Palermo version that adds octopus, and an aristocratic Sicilian recipe includes lobster and swordfish garnished with wild asparagus, grated dried tuna roe and shrimp. However, these last examples are exceptions to the general rule of a sweet and sour cooked vegetable stew or salad.

Today, caponata is typically used as a side dish for fish dishes and sometimes as an appetizer, but since the 18th century it has also been used as a main course.

A similar Neapolitan dish is called cianfotta. The dish is also popular in Tunisian cuisine.

Etymology 
The etymology of the name is not reliably known. Some suggest it derives from the Catalan language, others that it comes from the caupone, the sailors' taverns. The dishes described by Wright would suggest that in the past the Sicilian dish was similar to the Genoese capponata.

See also

Eggplant salads and appetizers
 List of eggplant dishes
 List of Sicilian dishes
 Ratatouille

References

External links
 The traditional Sicilian eggplant caponata recipe

Palermitan cuisine
Cuisine of Sicily
Tunisian cuisine
Eggplant dishes
Olive dishes